Emiliano Brembilla (born 21 December 1978) is a freestyle swimmer from Italy who was five-time individual European Champion, four in 400 m freestyle (1997, 2000, 2002 and 2004) and one in 1500 m freestyle (1997).

Career
He won the bronze medal with the men's 4×200 m freestyle relay team at the 2004 Summer Olympics in Athens, Greece. A long-distance specialist, he made his first mark at the 1997 European Swimming Championships in Seville, Spain, where he won three titles. Brembilla competed in four consecutive Summer Olympics for his native country, starting in 1996.

Personal bests
Individual long course
100 m freestyle: 50.58
200 m freestyle: 1:46.29 
400 m freestyle: 3:45.11
800 m freestyle: 7:55.17
1500 m freestyle: 14:58.65

National titles
Brembilla won 41 national championships at individual senior level.

Absolute (18)
 200 freestyle: 1996, 1997, 1999, 2000, 2002, 2005, 2008 (7)
 400 freestyle: 1996, 1997, 2000, 2002, 2004, 2005 (6)
 800 freestyle: 2002, 2004, 2005 (3)
 1500 freestyle: 1996, 2000 (2)

Winter (16)
200 freestyle: 2000, 2002, 2003 (3)
400 freestyle: 1996, 1997, 2000, 2002, 2003, 2004, 2005, 2006 (8)
800 freestyle: 2006 (1)
1500 freestyle: 1997, 1999, 2000 2002 (4)

Spring (7)
200 freestyle: 1998, 2002 (2)
200 freestyle: 1998, 2001, 2002, 2004 (4)
800 freestyle: 1998 (1)

See also
 European Aquatics Championships - Multiple medalists in swimming
 Italian swimmers multiple medalists at the internetional competitions

References

External links
 
 

1978 births
Living people
Sportspeople from the Province of Bergamo
Italian male swimmers
Olympic swimmers of Italy
Swimmers at the 1996 Summer Olympics
Swimmers at the 2000 Summer Olympics
Swimmers at the 2004 Summer Olympics
Swimmers at the 2008 Summer Olympics
Olympic bronze medalists for Italy
Olympic bronze medalists in swimming
Italian male freestyle swimmers
World Aquatics Championships medalists in swimming
Medalists at the FINA World Swimming Championships (25 m)
European Aquatics Championships medalists in swimming
Medalists at the 2004 Summer Olympics
Mediterranean Games gold medalists for Italy
Swimmers at the 1997 Mediterranean Games
Swimmers at the 2001 Mediterranean Games
Swimmers at the 2005 Mediterranean Games
Mediterranean Games medalists in swimming
Swimmers of Centro Sportivo Carabinieri
People from Ponte San Pietro
21st-century Italian people